Robert Weiss (born ) is an American author, educator, and clinical expert in the treatment of adult intimacy disorders and related addictions. Weiss currently serves as Chief Clinical Officer of Seeking Integrity.

Background

Raised in Westchester County, NY and New York City, Weiss attended Tulane University in New Orleans and then went on to complete his undergraduate studies at Emerson College in Boston, Massachusetts. In 1992, he received an MSW from UCLA and was then invited to provide residential sexual disorders treatment at Del Amo Hospital (Los Angeles) under the direction of Dr. Patrick Carnes. He received his California State license (LCSW) in 1995 and earned his doctorate from The International Institute of Clinical Sexology in 2018.

Work
Since the early 1990s, Weiss has been developing treatment programs on clinical education, therapy, and support to people affected by adult sexual disorders.

In 1995, Weiss founded the Sexual Recovery Institute (SRI), which offered intensive outpatient programs. In 2011, Weiss sold SRI to Elements Behavioral Health and became Elements' Senior Vice President of clinical development division. SRI finally closed its doors in 2015. In 2017, Weiss established Seeking Integrity, a clinic and treatment center providing recovery programs for sex addiction, porn addiction, and chemsex addiction, along with free information, videos, podcasts, blogs and more. In 2018, Compulsive Sexual Behavior Disorder (CSBD) was defined as a medical condition by the World Health Organization, which also announced it would include CSBD in the next edition of its diagnostic manual, the International Classification of Diseases (ICD-11), although "materials in ICD-11 make very clear that CSBD is not intended to be interchangeable with sex addiction, but rather is a substantially different diagnostic framework". As of 2021, Weiss was the chief clinical officer at Seeking Integrity Treatment Programs in Los Angeles. 
Dr. Weiss is a specialist in the field of sexual addiction. He also frequently serves as a subject-matter expert for media outlets including Larry King and Don Lemon's programs on CNN, Megyn Kelly Today NBC, HLN, The New York Times, and BBC, among others.

Publications
 
 
 
 
 
Weiss, Robert (2015). Sex Addiction 101: A Basic Guide to Healing from Sex, Love, and Porn Addiction.
 
Weiss, Robert (2018). Prodependence: Moving Beyond Codependency. Health Communications.  OCLC 1022500041
Weiss, Robert (2018) Sex Addiction 101, the Workbook: 24 Proven Exercises to Guide Sex Addiction Recovery.

In co-authorship
Weiss, R. (2002). Treatment concerns for gay male sex addicts. In P. Carnes & K. Adams (Eds.), Clinical management of sex addiction. New York, NY: Brunner-Routledge.
Weiss, R. (2004). Understanding assessment, diagnosis, and treatment of sexual addiction. In R. Coombs (Ed.), Handbook of addictive disorders: A practical guide to diagnosis and treatment. New York, NY: Wiley.
Weiss, R. (2009). Understanding sexual offending. In A. Neustein (Ed.), Tempest in the temple: Jewish communities and child sex scandals. Waltham, MA: Brandeis.
Weiss, R. (2011). How does sex addiction and infidelity affect gay couples? (for partners in same-sex relationships). In S. Carnes (Ed.), Mending a shattered heart: A guide for partners of sex addicts. Carefree, AZ: Gentle Path Press.

References

External links
 
 
Seeking Integrity LLC

Living people
UCLA Luskin School of Public Affairs alumni
Tulane University alumni
Emerson College alumni
American social workers
Year of birth missing (living people)
Social psychologists